Bradford Steven Tatum (born March 29, 1965, in California) is an American actor and author, known for his role as Michael Hubbs in the cult favorite stoner film The Stoned Age (1994). He also played the bully, John Box in Powder (1995). In 1999, Bradford wrote, directed, and starred in the indie film Standing on Fishes. Bradford is married to actress Stacy Haiduk, whom he guest-starred with in the seaQuest DSV episode "Nothing but the Truth". In 2006, Tatum released the indie film Salt: A Fatal Attraction, which he wrote, produced and starred in. This film also featured his wife, Stacy Haiduk, and his daughter, Sophia Tatum. In 2016, he joined the cast of the HBO series Westworld.

Filmography

Westworld (2 episodes, 2016)
Criminal Minds (1 episode; "Solitary Man", 2010)
Salt: A Fatal Attraction (2006)
The Lone Ranger (2003)
Fastlane (1 episode, 2003)
Melrose Place (1999)
Standing on Fishes (1999)
Charmed (1999)
 The Burning Zone (1997)
Down Periscope (1996)
NYPD Blue (1996)
Black Scorpion (1995)
Powder (1995)
Excessive Force II: Force on Force (1995)
Cool and the Crazy (1994)
Force on Force (1994)
The Stoned Age (1994)
Hunter (2 episodes, 1990)

External links

I Can Only Give You Everything – Bradford Tatum's novel
The Monster's Muse – Bradford Tatum's new novel

1965 births
American male film actors
Living people
American male television actors
Male actors from California
20th-century American male actors
21st-century American male actors